Grace Jackson-Small (born 14 June 1961) is a Jamaican former athlete who competed mainly in the 100 and 200 metres. She won an Olympic silver medal in the 200 metres at the 1988 Seoul Olympics, and is  a former Jamaican record-holder in the 200m and 400m. She was Jamaican Sportswoman of the Year in 1986 and 1988.

Career
Born in St. Ann, Jamaica, West Indies Federation, Jackson reached the 100m and 200m finals in the 1984 Los Angeles Olympics, finishing fifth in both. A year later, she won the 200m title at the 1985 Universiade and finished second in the 100m and 200m at the 1985 IAAF World Cup. She won a bronze medal in the 200m at the 1987 IAAF World Indoor Championships behind Heike Drechsler and Merlene Ottey.

The highlight of her career was at the 1988 Seoul Olympics, where she won a silver medal in the 200m behind Florence Griffith-Joyner's still-standing world record of 21.34. Jackson ran a Jamaican record time of 21.72 seconds that was .01 seconds short of the pre-Olympic world record Griffith-Joyner broke. In the process, she finished ahead of then-200m World Champion Silke Moller (5th), Heike Drechsler (3rd) and teammate Merlene Ottey (4th). Ottey would regain the Jamaican record in 1990. She won a silver medal in the 200m at the 1989 IAAF World Indoor Championships behind Ottey. Later that year she broke the Jamaican 400m record with a time of 49.57 seconds, which would stand as the national record for 13 years. In November 1990, she married Hugh Small.

Jackson concluded her international career by finishing sixth in the 200m final at the 1992 Barcelona Olympics.

Achievements 
Personal Bests:
100 metres - 11.08sec (1988) - also ran 10.97 wind-assisted (+3.0) in 1988
200 metres - 21.72sec (1988) - stood as Jamaican Record from 1988-1990 
400 metres - 49.57sec (1989) - stood as Jamaican Record from 1989-2002
Jamaican Sportswoman of the Year in 1986 and 1988

References

External links

 

1961 births
Living people
Jamaican female sprinters
Athletes (track and field) at the 1984 Summer Olympics
Athletes (track and field) at the 1988 Summer Olympics
Athletes (track and field) at the 1992 Summer Olympics
Olympic athletes of Jamaica
Olympic silver medalists for Jamaica
People from Saint Ann Parish
Commonwealth Games medallists in athletics
Medalists at the 1988 Summer Olympics
Olympic silver medalists in athletics (track and field)
Athletes (track and field) at the 1982 Commonwealth Games
Commonwealth Games bronze medallists for Jamaica
Universiade medalists in athletics (track and field)
Goodwill Games medalists in athletics
Universiade gold medalists for Jamaica
Universiade bronze medalists for Jamaica
World Athletics Indoor Championships medalists
Medalists at the 1983 Summer Universiade
Competitors at the 1990 Goodwill Games
Central American and Caribbean Games medalists in athletics
Olympic female sprinters
20th-century Jamaican women
21st-century Jamaican women
Medallists at the 1982 Commonwealth Games